Bob Hoag is an American record producer, songwriter and musician based in Mesa, Arizona. In 2005, he was recruited to be the pianist and keyboardist for American rock band The Ataris.

Career
Hoag wrote songs for his group, The Go Reflex, as well as his previous group, Pollen.  His main band, The Go Reflex, includes Kevin Scanlon from the now defunct band, Pollen (Hoag played the drums and wrote the songs).  In The Go Reflex, Hoag once again writes the songs but also sings and plays piano as well as drums.  He also played drums and recorded records for the power-pop/garage group The Breakup Society, as well as The Love Me Nots.  He currently runs Flying Blanket Recording in Mesa, Arizona where he has produced and recorded many musicians who have led successful careers.

Hoag generally contributes musically to most of the records he produces as well and can be heard singing, playing piano/keyboards, and doing various percussion on most of those releases.  The Go Reflex has not been active since Kevin Scanlon moved to Los Angeles to pursue a career in photography in 2004.  There were two shows in late 2004, featuring a heavily expanded line-up but the group would not play again until the summer of 2006 (a benefit show), which was done with the band's original line-up.  There was also a show in summer 2007 with a heavily expanded and different line-up but still featuring Scanlon on guitar.  Hoag has cited his busy recording schedule as the main reason behind the group's recent inactivity and continuously claims that the band will one day become active again.

He is married and has two children.

Musicians recorded or produced by Hoag

 Adam Panic
 Alaska & Me
 Almost Always
 Art for Starters
 Asia Blonde
 The Ataris
 Austin Gibbs
 Awake and Alert
 Back Ted N-Ted
 Bad Lucy
 Banana Gun
 Bears of Manitou
 Before Braille
 Bella
 Birds of India
 Black Box Burning
 Black Carl
 The Bled
 Bogan Via
 The Breakup Society
 Andrew Duncan Brown
 Calabrese (band)
 Captain Squeegee
 Chrome Rhino
 Citizen Media
 Courtney Marie Andrews
 Dear and the Headlights
Don't Miss the Big
 Dorsey
 The Fair and Debonair
 Fairy Bones
 Felix
 Fifteen Minutes Fast
 Fine China
 Fivespeed
 The Format
 Future Loves Past
 Girl Repellent
 Gin Blossoms
 Glitter Dick
 Gospel Claws
 Haffo
 Harper and the Moths
 Heist At Hand
 Hot House Orchids
 Hour of the Wolf
 Hunter Johnson
 iamwe
 The Impossibles
 Jared & The Mill
 J.D. Stooks
 Joel Plaskett
 Juicy Newt
 Kinch
 Kiras Rage
 Thomas Knight
 The Letterpress
 Life in Pictures
 Life In Stereo
 Limbeck
 love, PALMS
 The Loveblisters
 Loyal Wife
 Mergence
 Mr. Kline and the Wizards of Time
 Neba
 O'Henry
 Pollen
 This Past Year (later known as The Format)
 Recover
 The Retaliation for What They Have Done to Us
 Scary Kids Scaring Kids
 Seven Car Pileup
 Sharkspeed
 Shotstar
 Sister Cities
 Snake! Snake! Snakes!
 Sugar High
 TOAD (Take Over and Destroy)
 Tickertape Parade
 Tugboat
 Undeclared
 Until August
 Velveteen Dream
 Vincent Liou
 What Laura Says

References

External links
Flying Blanket Recording Official Website

American rock musicians
Record producers from Arizona
American male songwriters
Year of birth missing (living people)
Living people
Place of birth missing (living people)
Musicians from Mesa, Arizona
Songwriters from Arizona
The Ataris members